Gudbrand Gregersen de Saág (born Gudbrand Gregersen; ; 17 April 1824 – 24 December 1910) was a Norwegian-born Hungarian bridge engineer, architect and member of the Hungarian nobility since 1884.

Biography 

Gregersen was born on 17 April 1824 to farmer Nils Gregersen (1804–1868) and Anne Trulsdatter (1803–1838) in Modum, Norway.

A young man and a crafter, Gregersen came to Budapest, Habsburg Empire in the 1850s, where he established a company within general contracting. After a few years, the company had become one of the leading in the Kingdom.

Living in the town Szob, near to Budapest, Gregersen was married with Aloyzia (Luise) Sümegh (1836–1906), a daughter of Josef Sümegh and Katharina Stitz. They had 19 children together, of whom seven died as infants.

Gregersen designed the Elisabeth Bridge between the two parts of the city of Komárom, Austria-Hungary (today between the cities of Komárom, Hungary and Komárno, Slovakia. He also designed and lead the carpenter works on the building of the Hungarian Parliament and the Museum of Fine Arts and on the former building of the National Theatre in Budapest.

In 1884 Gregersen with wife and (some) children were ennobled by Francis Joseph, Apostolic King of Hungary. They were also granted a coat of arms which, in the upper field, displays the Norwegian Lion.

Gregersen died on 24 December 1910 in Szob, Hungary. He remained a Lutheran all his life.

See also 
 Hungarian nobility

Literature 

Norwegian
 Norwegian Biographical Encyclopædia: Gudbrand Gregersen Saági
 Drammens Tidende: Bondesønn ble nasjonalhelt
 Økonomisk Rapport: Portrettet: Adelig og følsom
 Sveaas, P.A.: Familien Gregersen og Gudbrand Gregersen, ungarsk adelsmann fra Modum

Hungarian
 Evangélikus Országos Múzeum: Gregersen, Gudbrand

1824 births
1910 deaths
Hungarian nobility
Hungarian people of Norwegian descent
Hungarian engineers
Norwegian engineers
Bridge engineers
People from Modum
Hungarian architects
Hungarian Lutherans
19th-century Lutherans